"Doop" is a song by Dutch Eurodance group Doop. It was released on 28 February 1994 as the first single from the debut album Circus Doop (1994). The song achieved success in several countries, including Ireland and the US, where it hit number two on the Billboard Hot Dance Club Play chart. In addition, the song spent three weeks at the top of the charts in the United Kingdom. It consists of a Charleston-based big band number set against a house backing track. Two main versions (each with its own corresponding radio edit) were issued under the names of two different big bands, with the "Urge 2 Merge radio mix" combining sections of both. In 2005, the song was covered by Looney Tunez vs. Doop.

Critical reception
Larry Flick from Billboard wrote, "European pop smash finally gets a shot at stateside success. Mostly instrumental romp combines a steady dance beat with classic ragtime music to blasting effect. Crashing cymbals and brassy horns will keep the summer vibe alive on top 40 and rhythm-crossover radio. Icing on the cake are 'doop-doop' vocal samples and live marching drum rolls." Tom Ewing of Freaky Trigger noted that "while it's never anything more than 'the Charleston with a donk on it', it's also far more generous with its hooks and energy than one-line descriptions suggest. It does enough with its squealing horns and showy, tumbling drum samples that the entry of the scoo-be-doo vocals feels like a delightful bonus." 

James Masterton wrote in his weekly UK chart commentary, "Quite why a piece of instrumental jazz should have become so big is really one to puzzle at, yet it is an astoundingly brilliant record and as a national talking-point has to be fancied for a No.1 position next week." Maria Jimenez from Music & Media remarked that the single "takes the old charleston and drops it into a '90s dance music context." Andy Beevers from Music Week rated the song four out of five, adding that "this unlikely combination of Nineties house sounds and Twenties Charleston/ragtime rhythms" has been "creating dancefloor mayhem ever since." He concluded, "There is bound to be strong DJ demand for the track, which could crossover in a big way thanks to its novelty value." Sylvia Patterson from Smash Hits gave "Doop" three out of five, writing, "Ludicrously catchy mickey-mouse rave-up sensation featuring someone playing the spoons, someone on the party blower with a feather on the end of it and Rolf Harris on the stylophone."

Chart performance
"Doop" went on to become a major hit on the charts on several continents. It remains the group's most successful song to date, peaking at number one in the United Kingdom for three weeks in March 1994, starting from its second week on the UK Singles Chart. In its third week at No. 1, it prevented Bruce Springsteen from achieving what could have been his first UK No. 1 with "Streets of Philadelphia". It also topped the UK Dance Singles Chart. Additionally, it made the top 10 charts in Finland (number three), Germany, Hungary, Ireland (number two), Norway, Poland, Spain (number three) and Switzerland (number two), as well as on the Eurochart Hot 100, where the song soared to number three. Outside Europe, "Doop" peaked at number two on the US Billboard Hot Dance Club Play chart, number five in Australia and was also a top 10 hit in Israel. The single was awarded with a gold record in Australia and the United Kingdom, with a sale of 35,000 and 400,000 units.

Music video
The accompanying music video for "Doop" was directed by Czar. Mick Green from Cash Box commented, "The accompanying video features two girl singers in flapper dresses dancing their own version of the Charleston and a dancer in top hat and tails carrying an imaginary cane, twisting and sliding in a modern variation of the original steps. It has caused a dance sensation, and in clubs throughout the UK youngsters are copying or making up their own steps. They used to say “bop until you drop,” now it appears to be “doop until you’re pooped!”" Sylvia Patterson from Smash Hits said, "This lot did that quite good video with the turntables that turned into the word "doop"." The video was A-listed on Germany's VIVA in April 1994.

Track listings
These are the formats and track listings of major single releases of "Doop":

Original version
 CD single
 "Doop" (Jean Lejeux & son Orchestre) – 3:35
 "Doop" (Sidney Berlin ragtime band) – 3:08

 Cassette, 7" single
 "Doop" (Urge 2 Merge radio mix) – 3:33
 "Doop" (Jean Lejeux radio mix) – 3:26

 CD maxi, Europe & Australia
 "Doop" (Sidney Berlin's ragtime band) – 3:08
 "Doop" (Jean Lejeux & son Ochestre) – 3:26
 "Doop" (Urge 2 merge) – 3:33
 "Doop" (Sidney Berlin's ragtime band – extended version) – 5:28
 "Doop" (Jean Lejeux & son Ochestre – extended version) – 7:18

 CD maxi, UK
 "Doop" (Urge 2 merge radio mix) – 3:33
 "Doop" (Jean Lejeux radio mix) – 3:26
 "Doop" (Sidney Berlin ragtime radio edit) – 3:08
 "Doop" (Mother remix) – 7:17
 "Doop" (Judge Jules and Michael Skins remix) – 6:06

 CD maxi, US
 "Doop" (Sidney Berlin ragtime band) – 3:08
 "Doop" (Def Doop mix) – 11:32
 "Doop" (Sidney Berlin ragtime band—extended version) – 5:28
 "Doop" (Jean Lejeux & son Orchestre—extended version) – 7:18
 "Doop" (basstrumental) – 6:40
 "Doop" (capricorn remix) – 6:55

 CD maxi, France
 "Doop" (original mix) – 3:10
 "Doop" (radio edit) – 3:35
 "Doop" (capricorn remix edit) – 4:40

 12" maxi, Netherlands
 "Doop" (Jean Lejeux & son Orchestre) – 7:18
 "Doop" (Sidney Berlin ragtime band) – 5:28
 "Doop" (Doop dub) – 5:28
 "Doop" (Urge 2 merge) – 5:31

 12" maxi, UK
 "Doop" (Jean Lejeux & son Orchestre) – 7:18
 "Doop" (Mother remix) – 6:10
 "Doop" (Sidney Berlin ragtime band) – 5:28
 "Doop" (Judge Jules and Michael Skins remix) – 6:06

 12" maxi, US
 "Doop" (Def Doop mix) – 11:32
 "Doop" (Sidney Berlin ragtime band – extended version) – 5:28
 "Doop" (basstrumental) – 6:40

Remixes
 CD maxi, France
 "Doop" (Def Doop mix) – 11:32
 "Doop" (David Morales radio mix) – 3:45
 "Doop" (D. Beat) – 4:18
 "Doop" (basstrumental) – 6:40

 CD maxi, Germany
 "Doop" (Jean Lejeux & son Orchestre) – 7:18
 "Doop" (Mother remix) – 6:10
 "Doop" (Sidney Berlin ragtime band) – 5:28
 "Doop" (Judge Jules and Michael Skins remix) – 6:06

 CD maxi, Netherlands & Australia
 "Doop" (Jean Lejeux Station edit) – 3:35
 "Doop" (Sidney Berlin ragtime band) – 3:08
 "Doop" (capricorn remix) – 6:55
 "Doop" (Ferry & Garnefski remix) – 7:20
 "Yabadabadoop!" – 8:13

 12" maxi, Germany
 "Doop" (capricorn remix) – 6:55
 "Doop" (Doop dub) – 5:38
 "Yabadabadoop!" – 8:13
 "Doop" (Mother remix) – 7:17
 "Doop" (Judge Jules & Michael Skins remix) – 6:06

 12" maxi, Netherlands
 "Doop" (Capricorn remix) – 6:55
 "Doop" (Ferry & Garnefski remix) – 7:20
 "Yabadabadoop!" – 8:13

Charts and sales

Weekly charts

Year-end charts

Certifications

References

1994 songs
1994 singles
UK Singles Chart number-one singles
Music Week number-one dance singles
Number-one singles in Scotland
Doop (band) songs
Eurodance songs
Electro swing songs
Music videos directed by Czar (director)